Paston and Knapton railway station was a station in North Norfolk on the Norfolk and Suffolk Joint Railway line between Cromer Beach and North Walsham. It served the settlements of Paston and Knapton, through it was nearer to the latter. It closed on 5 October 1964 to passengers and to goods on 28 December 1964.

References

External links
 Paston and Knapton station on 1946 O. S. map

Disused railway stations in Norfolk
Former Norfolk and Suffolk Joint Railway stations
Railway stations in Great Britain opened in 1898
Railway stations in Great Britain closed in 1964
Beeching closures in England